Acton is a small unincorporated community located about seven miles (11 km) due east of Granbury on the Brazos River in Hood County, Texas, United States.  Acton was formerly called Commanche Peak and was later renamed to Acton, possibly after the old English word meaning "oak town", a reference to the large stands of oak trees in the vicinity.

It is the home of Acton State Historic Site, which is the burial site of Elizabeth Crockett, second wife of Davy Crockett. The Acton Nature Center of Hood County is open to anyone who enjoys the peace and quiet of nature at its finest. Hiking and bike trails will lead you around the centers .

Acton is part of the Granbury, Texas Micropolitan Statistical Area. A large portion of the area is in the DeCordova ETJ.  Acton/DCBE Fire Department, United Cooperative Services and AMUD provide services to the area.

In 1990, the population was about 450 people.

References

External links
 

Unincorporated communities in Hood County, Texas
Unincorporated communities in Texas
Granbury micropolitan area